Põhara is a village in Pärnu urban municipality, Pärnu County, in southwestern Estonia. It has a population of 98 (as of 1 January 2011).

References

Villages in Pärnu County